Ha Wan Tsuen is a village in the Lok Ma Chau area of Yuen Long District, Hong Kong.

See also
 Lok Ma Chau Village, another village in the Lok Ma Chau area

External links

 Delineation of area of existing village Ha Wan Tsuen (San Tin) for election of resident representative (2019 to 2022)

Villages in Yuen Long District, Hong Kong
Lok Ma Chau